is a former Japanese football player.

Playing career
Abe was born in Saitama on August 1, 1974. After he dropped out from University of Tsukuba, he joined Kashima Antlers in 1995. Although he played many matches in 1995, he could hardly play in the matches in 1996 and 1997. He also played for CFZ in 1997. From 1998, he played many matches and the club won the 1999 J1 League. In Asia, the club finished in third place of the 1998–99 Asian Cup Winners' Cup. In 2000, he moved to newly relegated J2 League club, Urawa Reds, based in his local area. He played many matches and the club returned to the J1 League in a year. However his opportunity to play decreased in 2002. In September 2002, he moved to newly was promoted to J1 club, Vegalta Sendai. Although he played in 2 seasons, the club was relegated to J2 end of the 2002 season. In 2004, he moved to newly promoted J1 club, Albirex Niigata. However he could hardly play in the match for injury. In 2005, he moved to his first club Kashima Antlers and retired at the end of the 2005 season.

Club statistics

References

External links

Profile

1974 births
Living people
University of Tsukuba alumni
Association football people from Saitama Prefecture
Japanese footballers
J1 League players
J2 League players
Kashima Antlers players
Urawa Red Diamonds players
Vegalta Sendai players
Albirex Niigata players
Association football midfielders